Hydrogenophaga luteola is a bacterium from the genus of Hydrogenophaga which has been isolated from pond water from Shangqiu in China.

References

Comamonadaceae
Bacteria described in 2015